The Indianapolis Blues were a professional baseball team based in Indianapolis, Indiana, that played in the National League for one season in 1878. The franchise used South Street Park as their home field. During their only season in existence, the team finished fifth in the NL with a record of 24-36.

Players

References

External links
Franchise index at Baseball-Reference and Retrosheet

Major League Baseball all-time rosters